Mangwolsa Station is a metro station on Seoul Subway Line 1. Named after a Silla-era Buddhist temple in the mountains to the west, it is the first station for services leaving Seoul heading north, and lies in the city of Uijeongbu.

Exits
 Exit 1: Jungnangcheon, Howon 1-dong Community Center
 Exit 2: Mangwolsa, Shinheung College, Hoam Elementary School, Howon-dong Community Center, Hoeryong Elementary School
 Exit 3: Shinheung College, Hoam Elementary School, Howon-dong Community Center

References 

Seoul Metropolitan Subway stations
Metro stations in Uijeongbu
Railway stations opened in 1986